General elections were held in Guinea-Bissau on 28 November 1999, with a second round for the presidential election on 16 January 2000. The presidential election resulted in a victory for opposition leader Kumba Ialá of the Party for Social Renewal (PRS), who defeated Malam Bacai Sanhá of the ruling African Party for the Independence of Guinea and Cape Verde. The PRS were also victorious in the National People's Assembly election, winning 38 of the 102 seats. This was the first time an opposition party won an election since the country's independence in the 1970s.

Voter turnout was 72% for the second round of the presidential election.

Results

President

National People's Assembly

References

Guinea-Bissau
Guinea-Bissa
General
General
Elections in Guinea-Bissau
Presidential elections in Guinea-Bissau
Election and referendum articles with incomplete results
Guinea-Bissau
Guinea-Bissau